Henry Benedict Birch (born February 1969) is a British businessman, and the chief executive officer (CEO) of The Very Group, since May 2018, having previously been CEO of The Rank Group since May 2014.

Birch was born in February 1969, and educated at the University of Edinburgh where he received a master's degree in Political Science, followed by an MBA from the Stanford Graduate School of Business.

References

1969 births
Alumni of the University of Edinburgh
Stanford Graduate School of Business alumni
British chief executives
Living people